NBOMe-mescaline or mescaline-NBOMe is a synthetic substituted phenethylamine. It is a partial agonist of serotonin receptors with a 5-HT2A pKi originally reported as 7.3 (i.e. Ki of approximately 50nM), though more modern techniques assayed it as 140nM at 5-HT2A and 640nM at 5-HT2C, making it one of the least potent compounds among the N-benzyl phenethylamines.

History  
NBOMe-mescaline and NBOMe-escaline were first reported in 1999 resulting from research performed at Free University of Berlin concerning their activity as partial agonists at rat vascular 5-HT2A receptors. NBOMe-mescaline was first reported in September 2008 to have been self administered by humans as a psychedelic drug at some unspecified point prior. It first became available as a commodity in the research chemical market in May 2010 several months after a few 25x-NBOMes became available.

Properties and chemistry 

Solubility of the hydrochloride salt: ~5 mg/ml in Phosphate Buffered Saline (PBS) @ pH 7.2; ~10 mg/ml in ethanol & DMF; ~20 mg/ml in DMSO.

Synthesis 
NBOMe-mescaline can be synthesized from mescaline and 2-methoxybenzaldehyde, via reductive alkylation. That can be done stepwise by first making the imine and then reducing the formed imine with sodium borohydride, or by direct reaction with sodium triacetoxyborohydride. An alternative production method which removes the need to obtain the illegal compound mescaline as an isolated precursor can be achieved via a one-pot reaction utilizing 3,4,5-trimethoxyphenylacetonitrile with Lithium Aluminium Hydride as a reducing agent.

Psychedelic dosage in humans 
There have been very few reports of human use of NBOMe-mescaline. Psychedelic visual, auditory and mental effects start around 50 mg intranasally.

Legal status
NBOMe-mescaline is not listed in the schedules set out by the United Nations' Single Convention on Narcotic Drugs from 1961 nor their Convention on Psychotropic Substances from 1971, so the signatory countries to these international drug control treaties are not required by said treaties to control NBOMe-mescaline.

United States 
NBOMe-mescaline is not listed in the list of scheduled controlled substances in the USA. It is therefore not scheduled at the federal level in the United States, but it is possible that NBOMe-mescaline could legally be considered an analog of mescaline, and therefore sales or possession could potentially be prosecuted under the Federal Analogue Act.

United Kingdom

See also 
 Mescaline
 2-Bromomescaline
 Trifluoromescaline
 25I-NBOMe

References

External links 
 NBOMe-mescaline @ IsomerDesign
 The Big & Dandy NBOMe-Mescaline Thread @ BlueLight.org
 Erowid Experience Vaults: Mescaline-NBOMe (also 345-NBOMe)

25-NB (psychedelics)
Entheogens
Psychedelic phenethylamines
Serotonin receptor agonists